Dark Things is an anthology of horror stories edited by American writer  August Derleth. It was released in 1971 by Arkham House in an edition of 3,051 copies.  It was Derleth's fourth anthology of previously unpublished stories released by Arkham House. A translation in Japanese has also been released.

Contents

Dark Things contains the following tales:

 "The Funny Farm", by Robert Bloch
 "The Eyes of Mme. Dupree", by P.H. Booth
 "'The Peril That Lurks Among Ruins'", by Joseph Payne Brennan
 "Napier Court", by Ramsey Campbell
 "Shaggai", by Lin Carter (Cthulhu Mythos tale)
 "The Dweller in the Tomb", by Lin Carter (Cthulhu Mythos tale)
 "The House by the Tarn", by Basil Copper
 "The Knocker at the Portico", by Basil Copper
 "Lord of the Depths", by David Drake
 "Omega", by Alice R. Hill
 "The House in the Oaks", by Robert E. Howard and August Derleth
 "The Singleton Barrier", by Carl Jacobi
 "The Case of the Double Husband", by Margery Lawrence
 "Innsmouth Clay", by H. P. Lovecraft and August Derleth
 "The Conch Shell", by Brian Lumley
 "Rising With Surtsey", by Brian Lumley
 "Company in the Orchard", by Francis May
 "'Beyondaril'", by John Metcalfe
 "The Manterfield Inheritance", by Charles Partington
 "The Storm King", by Emil Petaja
 "The Elevator", by James Wade
 "Appointment with Fire", by H. Russell Wakefield
 "The Rings of the Papaloi", by Donald J. Walsh, Jr.
 "Requiem for Earth", by Donald Wandrei

Sources

1971 anthologies
Fantasy anthologies
Horror anthologies
Arkham House books